The 1967 Syracuse Orangemen football team represented Syracuse University during the 1967 NCAA University Division football season. The Orangemen were led by 19th-year head coach Ben Schwartzwalder and played their home games at Archbold Stadium in Syracuse, New York. The team finished with an 8–2 record and were ranked 12th in final Coaches Poll (the AP Poll ranked only 10 teams at the time), but failed to receive an invitation to a bowl.

Regular season
In 1967, Tom Coughlin set the school's single-season pass receiving record. Larry Csonka was in his senior season and was named an All-American. He broke many of the school's rushing records, including some previously held by Ernie Davis, Jim Nance, Floyd Little, and Jim Brown.

In his three seasons at Syracuse, Csonka rushed for a school record 2,934 yards, rushed for 100 yards in 14 different games, and averaged 4.9 yards per carry.  From 1965 to 1967, he ranked 19th, 9th and 5th in the nation in rushing. He was the Most Valuable Player in the East–West Shrine Game, the Hula Bowl, and the College All-Star Game.

Schedule

1967 team players in the NFL

References

Syracuse
Syracuse Orange football seasons
Syracuse Orangemen football